The 1957 Southern 500, the eighth running of the event, was a NASCAR Grand National Series event that was held on September 2, 1957, at Darlington Raceway in Darlington, South Carolina.

Herb Thomas, already a three-time Southern 500 winner, arrived in Darlington in a visibly shaken state. Thomas finally gave up his ride to Fonty Flock stating that he was just too nervous to drive the race. The race was then marred by a violent crash involving him,  Bobby Myers and Paul Goldsmith, causing severe injuries to all drivers involved, ending Flock's career and resulting in the death of Myers.

Background
Darlington Raceway, nicknamed by many NASCAR fans and drivers as "The Lady in Black" or "The Track Too Tough to Tame" and advertised as a "NASCAR Tradition", is a race track built for NASCAR racing located near Darlington, South Carolina. It is of a unique, somewhat egg-shaped design, an oval with the ends of very different configurations, a condition which supposedly arose from the proximity of one end of the track to a minnow pond the owner refused to relocate. This situation makes it very challenging for the crews to set up their cars' handling in a way that will be effective at both ends.

The track is a four-turn  oval. The track's first two turns are banked at twenty-five degrees, while the final two turns are banked two degrees lower at twenty-three degrees. The front stretch (the location of the finish line) and the back stretch is banked at six degrees. Darlington Raceway can seat up to 60,000 people.

Darlington has something of a legendary quality among drivers and older fans; this is probably due to its long track length relative to other NASCAR speedways of its era and hence the first venue where many of them became cognizant of the truly high speeds that stock cars could achieve on a long track. The track allegedly earned the moniker The Lady in Black because the night before the race the track maintenance crew would cover the entire track with fresh asphalt sealant, in the early years of the speedway, thus making the racing surface dark black. Darlington is also known as "The Track Too Tough to Tame" because drivers can run lap after lap without a problem and then bounce off of the wall the following lap. Racers will frequently explain that they have to race the racetrack, not their competition. Drivers hitting the wall are considered to have received their "Darlington Stripe" thanks to the missing paint on the right side of the car.

Race report
Seventy-five thousand fans attended. Billy Carden qualified for this event in 45th place and finished in 6th place. The most notable crew chiefs for this race were Jess Potter, Bud Moore, Shorty Johns and Ray Fox.

Thompson drove the iconic 1957 Chevrolet during that race; that vehicle went on to win the 1958 and the 1959 runnings of the Southern 500. Owens won the pole position with a speed of  during qualifying. Speedy Thompson would record his only Southern 500 victory here even though he would win on other paved superspeedways.

T.A. Toomes received the last-place finish due to a problem with his brakes on lap 3 out of 364. Runt Harris returned to NASCAR after a 7-year absence, driving his way to a 39th-place finish after his vehicle developed problems with its clutch. Former Cup series race winner Bill Blair made his only start of the 1957 NASCAR Grand National Series season; finishing in 38th place after inflicting terminal damage to his vehicle.

Brownie King was 59 laps down; he started in 31st and managed to improve his position to 21st place. However, he was unable to properly compete for a win or even a finish in the top-15.

Bobby Myers lost his life as a result of a race-related crash; Fonty Flock and Paul Goldsmith were also involved in this accident. The technology found in the modern NASCAR Cup Series vehicles could have saved Myers' life, and it's a shame because Myers had a promising career in NASCAR racing.

George Parrish made a notable appearance in this race using a 1956 Studebaker Golden Hawk; he witnessed the fatal crash of Bobby Myers at close range. Parrish retired after the 1958 NASCAR Cup Series season.

As a rookie, Cale Yarborough made his NASCAR debut here and finished in 42nd place (out of 50 drivers). Fonty Flock retired after this race.

Qualifying

Failed to qualify: Eddie Skinner (#28), Ted Chamberlain (#93), Joe Eubanks (#82), Fred Knapp (#37), Duke DeBrizzi (#81), Dave Terrell (#9), Larry Frank (#76), Bill Widenhouse (#5), Arden Mounts (#18), Bob Whitmire (#61), Barney Smith (#16), Jim Linke (#81)

Finishing order
Section reference:

Timeline
Section reference:
 Start of race: Cotton Owens officially started the race as the pole position driver.
 Lap 3: Brake problems on T.A. Toomes' vehicle made him the last-place finisher.
 Lap 7: Curtis Turner took over the lead from Cotton Owens.
 Lap 11: Paul Goldsmith took over the lead from Curtis Turner.
 Lap 13: Oil pressure issues managed to bump Neil Castles out of the race.
 Lap 14: Bobby Myers took over the lead from Paul Goldsmith.
 Lap 15: Curtis Turner took over the lead from Bobby Myers.
 Lap 17: Cotton Owens took over the lead from Curtis Turner.
 Lap 18: Fonty Flock had a terminal crash.
 Lap 19: Frankie Schneider's engine stopped working properly.
 Lap 22: One of Gwyn Staley's coil came loose; forcing him to stop racing for the rest of the day.
 Lap 23: One of Chuck Hansen's racing pistons stopped working; forcing him to stop racing for the rest of the day.
 Lap 27: Fonty Flock, Bobby Myers and Paul Goldsmith crash, resulting in the death of Bobby Myers
 Lap 29: Lee Petty took over the lead from Cotton Owens.
 Lap 37: Joe Weatherly had a terminal crash.
 Lap 41: Fireball Roberts took over the lead from Lee Petty.
 Lap 50: Runt Harris' vehicle had some problems with its clutch; forcing him to exit the race for safety reasons.
 Lap 63: Bill Blair had a terminal crash.
 Lap 66: Joe Caspolich had a terminal crash.
 Lap 70: Lee Petty took over the lead from Fireball Roberts.
 Lap 79: Shorty York blew his engine while racing at high speeds.
 Lap 84: Tom Pistone's vehicle suffered from piston troubles.
 Lap 89: Fireball Roberts took over the lead from Lee Petty.
 Lap 99: Parnelli Jones had a terminal crash.
 Lap 101: Jack Smith took over the lead from Fireball Roberts.
 Lap 102: Bill Amick had a terminal crash.
 Lap 110: Speedy Thompson took over the lead from Jack Smith.
 Lap 130: Bill Champion managed to break the rear end of the vehicle.
 Lap 155: Peck Peckham blew his engine while racing at high speeds.
 Lap 156: The radiator on Bob Duell's vehicle finally gave out.
 Lap 171: Curtis Turner took over the lead from Speedy Thompson.
 Lap 210: Axle problems on Rex White's vehicle managed to force him off the track.
 Lap 215: Whitey Norman blew his engine while racing at high speeds.
 Lap 216: Speedy Thompson took over the lead from Curtis Turner.
 Lap 221: Marvin Porter blew his engine while racing at high speeds.
 Lap 281: Lee Petty had a terminal crash.
 Lap 308: Tiny Lund had a terminal crash.
 Lap 348: Jack Smith had a terminal crash.
 Finish: Speedy Thompson in a 57 chevy sedan won the race by 3 laps over Cotton Owens.

References

Southern 500
Southern 500
NASCAR races at Darlington Raceway